Brett Bailey (born 1967) is a playwright, artist, designer, play director, festival curator and the artistic director of the group Third World Bun Fight. He was the curator of South Africa's only public arts festival, Infecting the City, in Cape Town, South Africa, from 2008 until 2011. His works have played across Europe, Australia and Africa, and have won several awards, including a gold medal for design at the Prague Quadrennial (2007).

History 
Brett Bailey was born in 1967 and completed a postgraduate diploma in performance studies at the Dasarts Master of Theatre in Amsterdam. He has worked throughout South Africa, and in Zimbabwe, Uganda, Haiti, the UK and across Europe. His acclaimed iconoclastic dramas, which interrogate the dynamics of the post-colonial world, include Big Dada, Ipi Zombi, iMumbo Jumbo and Orfeus. His performance installations include Blood Diamonds: Terminal and Exhibit A: Deutsch Sudwestafrika. He directed the opening show at the 4th World Summit on Arts and Culture (2009), and from 2006 until 2011 has directed the opening shows for the Harare International Festival of the Arts. He has been the curator of Africa Centre's Infecting the City since 2008.

Works 
The work of Bailey investigates the many layers and intricacies of colonial and post-colonial Africa.

Bailey's earlier works – Ipi Zombi, iMumbo Jumbo and The Prophet – are grouped together under the title Plays of Miracle and Wonder (which is the title of a book on Bailey's plays) and incorporate ceremony and sacrament. These works are aggressive with Bailey using drums, screams, knives and broken glass to break down the audiences' defences.

In Ipi Zombi, Bailiey evoked a 1996 witch-hunt in which several women were blamed and killed for the death of twelve boys in a minivan accident. It combined Xhosa and Christian ritual. Author Zakes Mda claimed Ipi Zombi to be a "A work of genius that maps out a path to a new South African theatre ..."

In other works, such as Orfeus, Bailey takes a softer approach, and looks to highlight the blind, forgotten, the broken and the voiceless. In Orfeus, specifically, the audience is drawn down into an African underworld that is governed by a seedy businessman. Orfeus, and other works, look at a post-colonial, showing a "decaying globalised world in which not only shamanic rituals but also moving music create an entirely unique African atmosphere".

First staged in 2004 in Bern, Switzerland, House of The Holy Afro has been repeatedly staged in Europe and Australia with its last iteration at the Market Theatre Laboratory, Johannesburg, in June 2010. Performer and drag diva, Odidi Mfenyana plays the high priest of the holy house, and leads the performance through an urban funk cabaret that borders on spiritual ritual.

In the site-specific work medEia, the audience walked in silence for at least ten-minutes before the production. The audience's emotional and intellectual journey through works were physically manifest in the installations Blood Diamonds: Terminal and Exhibit A: Deutsch Sudwestafrika.

Exhibit A: Deutsch-Südwestafrika, staged in the Museum of Ethnology in Vienna's Hofburg Palace, is a "meditation on the dark history of European Racism in relation to Africa".

For the 4th World Summit on Arts and Culture, Bailey presented 3 Colours – a one-off mixed media performance piece. Bailey collaborated with award-winning choreographer Gregory Maqoma and Congolese musician Mapumba Cilombo. The piece represented the complexities of inter-culturalism, in which Bailey "chose to portray different societies or cultures symbolically as shrines. Indefinable as they are, our cultures are sacred to us. At the heart of each glows a unique cluster of precious jewels; our myths and histories, our heritage, our values and social structure, our cosmology, and relationship to the ultimate."

Bailey's curated the Infecting the City Festival from 2008 until 2011. It is currently Africa's biggest public arts festival that takes place in the public spaces of Cape Town during February or March of every year. During Bailey's tenure, the Festival chose a theme that had social relevance: "In a society that has as many complex issues as ours, if one is commandeering the communal spaces of the city, it is not enough merely to provide entertainment for the public. There is a moral imperative to tackle the pressing issues of our day, and to ask artists to apply themselves to these."

"Exhibit B" was a highly controversial traveling exhibit that began in 2010. Inspired by 19th century human zoos, it was seen by more than 25,000 people in 14 countries before the end of 2014. Museum and theater directors joined to decry attempts at censorship after the work sparked protests around the world for its use of black actors in cages and chains.

Productions 
 Jury of Prague Quadrennial – the International Exhibit of Scenography & Theatre Architecture: 2011
 Curator of Infecting the City: the Spier Public Arts Festival in inner-city Cape Town: February 2008 – February 2011
 Creator of opening concert of Harare International Festival of the Arts (HIFA): 2006, 2007, 2008, 2009 and 2011
 Director of opening performance at the World Summit on Arts & Culture in Johannesburg: 2009
 Wrote and directed biographical performance on Nelson Mandela for his 90th birthday party in Qunu, Eastern Cape, 2008.

Performances 
Exhibit A: made with Namibian Performers and Musicians, writer/director/designer
 2010 – Vienna Festival and Theaterformen Festival in Braunschweig

Orfeus: writer/director/designer
 2011 – Theaterformen Festival, Hannover
 2009 – Vienna Festival and Holland Festivals
 2007 – National Festival of the Arts (main program)
 2006 – Cape Town

macbEth: the opera: director/designer (written by Verdi)
 2007 – Cape Town
 2002 – Pretoria
 2001 – Cape Town

House of the Holy Afro: director/designer
 2010 – Market Theatre Johannesburg
 2009 – Perth and Adelaide Festivals, Australia. Linz European Capital of Culture programme and Rich Mix in London
 2008 – Sydney Festival; Zurich Spektakel
 2007 – Edinburgh Fringe Festival; Harare; Umea, Sweden
 2006 – Melbourne, Commonwealth Games
 2005 – Vienna Festival; Berlin; Brussels; Reunion Island
 2004 – Bern

Talking Heads: developed concept
 2008 – 2011, Infecting the City festival

medEia: director/designer (written by Oscar van Woensel)
 2005 – Cape Town
 2003 – Johannesburg

Big Dada: the rise and fall of Idi Amin: director/designer/writer
 2005 – Vienna Festival; Brussels; Berlin; Johannesburg; Cape Town
 2001 – Barbican Centre, London; Amsterdam; National Festival of the Arts (main program); Cape Town

Vodou Nation: made in Haiti, director/designer/writer
 2004 – London and 17 other UK cities

iMumbo Jumbo: writer/director/designer
 2003 – Barbican Centre, London; Cape Town
 1997 – National Festival of the Arts (main program); Johannesburg

Safari: C. G. Jung in Africa: made in Uganda, director/writer/designer
 2003: Kampala, Uganda; Amsterdam, Rotterdam and 13 other Dutch cities

The Prophet: director/writer/designer
 1999: National Festival of the Arts (main program)

Ipi Zombi: writer/director/designer
 1998: National Festival of the Arts (main program); Cape Town; Harare

Awards 
 2007: medEia won a gold medal for design at the Prague Quadrennial;
 2004: Honourable Mention for Brett Bailey's book The Plays of Miracle and Wonder at the Noma Award for Publishing in Africa
 2002: Fleur du Cap Awards/FNB Vita (Cape) award for Best Script of a New South African Play, and Best Costume Design for Big Dada;
 2001: Standard Bank Young Artist of the Year for drama; Big Dada presented at the National Arts Festival: Fleur Du Cap's Rosalie van der Gught Award for Best Young Director;
 1998: iMUMBO JUMBO: FNB Vita Awards for best director, original script and design.

Installations 
 Blood Diamonds: Terminal at National Festival of the Arts
 Exhibit A: Deutsch SudwestAfrika

Publications 
 The Plays of Miracle and Wonder – the texts of Third World Bunfight: 2001
 Published articles in The Theatre Review (TDR) and the South African Theatre Journal (SATJ)
 Feature on Brett Bailey by Daniel Larlham in the Yale Theatre Quarterly, 2009

References

External links 
 Third World Bunfight
 Infecting The City
 Africa Centre

South African artists
Living people
1967 births